Closer Than Veins is the third studio album by the Danish hip hop group Outlandish, released on 31 October 2005 by RCA Records.

Track listing

Notes
"Introspective" incorporates a sample from the title music from the movie Shalimar composed by Rahul Dev Burman.
"Kom igen" incorporates replayed and re-sung elements of "Dansevise" composed by Otto Francker & Sejr-Volmer Sørensen, and sung by Grethe and Jørgen Ingmann.
"The Vessel Interlude" incorporates a sample from the voice recording "The Vessel" of Shaykh Abdallah Adhami.
"Beyond Words" incorporates a sample from "Ederlezi" composed by Christoph Bowkowsky.

Charts and certifications

Charts

Certifications

References

Outlandish albums